Valentina Andrea Miranda Arce (born 2000) is a Chilean political activist who was elected as a member of the Chilean Constitutional Convention.

She supports Colo-Colo and was an active participant of the Social Outburst in Chile (2019–20).

References

External links
 

Living people
1999 births
Chilean activists
People from Santiago
21st-century Chilean politicians
21st-century Chilean women politicians
Communist Party of Chile politicians
Members of the Chilean Constitutional Convention
Chilean LGBT politicians
University of Chile alumni